Mikkelson is a surname of Scandinavian origin. Notable people with the surname include:

Bill Mikkelson (born 1948), retired Canadian ice hockey defenceman 
Brendan Mikkelson (born 1987), Canadian ice hockey defenceman 
Meaghan Mikkelson (born 1985), member of the 2009–10 Hockey Canada national women's team 
Tim Mikkelson (born 1986), New Zealand rugby union player 
Barbara and David Mikkelson, founders of Snopes.com, a fact-checking website

See also

 Michaelson
 Michelson
 Mickelson
 Michaelsen
 Michelsen
 Mikkelsen

Norwegian-language surnames
Patronymic surnames
Surnames from given names